State Line is an unincorporated community in western Sugar Creek Township, Vigo County, in the U.S. state of Indiana.

Named for its proximity to the state border between Indiana and Illinois, it is part of the Terre Haute metropolitan area.

Geography

References

Unincorporated communities in Indiana
Unincorporated communities in Vigo County, Indiana
Terre Haute metropolitan area